Joshua "Josh" O'Hanlon (born 25 September 1995) is an Irish former professional footballer who plays as a striker for Dandenong Thunder SC. He previously played for Longford Town (two spells), Bournemouth, Oxford City, Poole Town, York City, Chester, Newport County and St Patrick's Athletic.

Career
Born in Dublin, County Dublin, O'Hanlon played with St Kevin's Boys before joining Longford Town in February 2013. He scored on his first-team debut as a substitute in their 5–0 away win over Salthill Devon in the League of Ireland First Division on 8 March 2013. He finished the 2013 season with 8 goals from 26 appearances, as Longford lost the promotion play-offs to Bray Wanderers. He signed for English Championship club Bournemouth on 29 January 2014 on a three-and-a-half-year contract for a fee of around £50,000.

O'Hanlon joined Conference North club Oxford City on loan for the rest of the 2013–14 season on 25 March 2014. Making his debut a 4–0 away defeat to Leamington later that day, he completed his spell at Oxford City with four appearances.

O'Hanlon joined Southern League Premier Division team Poole Town on an initial one-month loan in July 2014. He made 12 appearances and scored seven goals for Poole before returning to Bournemouth with a knee injury in October 2014. O'Hanlon signed for League Two club York City on loan until the end of 2014–15 on 26 March 2015. He made his debut two days later as a 73rd-minute substitute for Jake Hyde in a 4–1 away win over Mansfield Town. He went on to make three appearances for York.

O'Hanlon joined National League club Chester on a one-month loan on 1 September 2015. The loan was cut short on 16 September 2015, as he struggled to break into the team.

On 8 January 2016, O'Hanlon re-joined League of Ireland Premier Division club Longford Town on loan for the first half of the 2016 season. He returned to his parent club having scored twice in his 17 appearances with Longford. He was released by Bournemouth at the end of 2015–16.

O'Hanlon joined League Two club Newport County on 8 November 2016 on a short-term contract, making his debut the same day after starting in a 2–0 home victory over AFC Wimbledon in the EFL Trophy. He was released by Newport on 9 January 2017, having failed to score in 10 appearances.

O'Hanlon was on trial at League of Ireland Premier Division club St Patrick's Athletic from his native Dublin in January 2017, appearing in friendlies. O'Hanlon signed a contract with the Saints on 21 February 2017, 3 days before the first game of the season at home to Bray Wanderers.

Despite scoring just 2 goals in 26 games for St Patrick's Athletic, O'Hanlon earned a move to champions Cork City on 10 November 2017 ahead of be 2018 season.

Career statistics

References

External links

1995 births
Living people
Association footballers from Dublin (city)
Republic of Ireland association footballers
Association football forwards
Longford Town F.C. players
St Patrick's Athletic F.C. players
Cork City F.C. players
AFC Bournemouth players
Oxford City F.C. players
Poole Town F.C. players
York City F.C. players
Chester F.C. players
Newport County A.F.C. players
League of Ireland players
National League (English football) players
Southern Football League players
English Football League players